Nycteola mauritia is a species of moth in the family Nolidae. It occurs only on some islands in the Indian Ocean, as Madagascar, Seychelles (Mahé, Praslin), Mauritius and Réunion.

Their larvae feed on Myrtaceae species, like Syzygium cumini., guava (Psidium pomiferum) and Eucalyptus robusta.

References

Chloephorinae
Moths of Mauritius
Moths of Seychelles
Moths of Madagascar
Moths of Réunion